Daniel da Silva (born 27 May 1973 in São Paulo) is a Brazilian footballer. He is currently without a club.

He had one international appearance for Brazil on 6 February 2002, a friendly match against Saudi Arabia.

Club statistics

National team statistics

Honours and awards
Copa Libertadores Runner up : 2002

References

External links
 
 CBF 
 

Brazilian footballers
Brazil international footballers
Brazilian expatriate footballers
Santos FC players
Tokyo Verdy players
Associação Desportiva São Caetano players
Sociedade Esportiva Palmeiras players
Expatriate footballers in Japan
Campeonato Brasileiro Série A players
Campeonato Brasileiro Série B players
J1 League players
Association football central defenders
Footballers from São Paulo
1973 births
Living people